Michel Adam Lisowski is a Polish businessman and the founder and sole owner of Fashion TV.

Biography 
Michel Adam Lisowski was born on April 16, 1950 in Warsaw to a family of Jewish descent. In 1958, he moved to Vienna where his father served as a diplomat at the International Atomic Energy Agency for the Polish government. After high school, Lisowski was granted a scholarship for Mathematics at Princeton University.

Lisowski started a textile business in Thailand called "Eden Group" and is currently the President of Fashion TV (FTV), for which he also runs the franchise "love-f-cafe" in various European cities, including Monaco and Milan. 

In 2013, he returned to Vienna with the opening of the café on the ground floor of the Hotel Bristol next to the opera house.

References

20th-century French businesspeople
20th-century Polish Jews
21st-century Polish Jews
Polish emigrants to France
Businesspeople from Warsaw
1950 births
Living people